Oskars Kļava (born 8 August 1983) is a Latvian football coach and a former defender. He is the manager of Spartaks Jūrmala.

Career

Club
Kļava was born in Liepāja. As a youth player he played for his local club Liepājas Metalurgs, making his first-team debut in 2002. That year he also made his Euro competitions' debut and was sent off against the Austrian club FC Kärnten in a 2002–03 UEFA Cup qualifying round match, which Kärnten won 2–0 on 15 August 2002. With the number of appearances growing each season, Kļava played in Liepāja for 9 seasons. He became a first eleven player in 2005. In January 2008 Kļava went on trial with Football League One side Leeds United in England. He left Metalurgs in 2010, having played 189 league matches, scoring 7 goals.

In June 2010 Kļava went on trial with the Russian Premier League club Anzhi Makhachkala and signed a three-year contract with them in August the same year. He was given the nr. 83 jersey at the club and, despite his surname being Kļava, he had his name Oskars written on it. He made his Premier League debut in the 17th round match against CSKA Moscow, coming on as a substitute on 15 August 2010. In his first season in Makhachkala Kļava appeared in 11 Premier League matches, as well as 12 reserve team games, scoring 1 goal. He lost his place in the starting line-up after the arrival of the Brazilian legend Roberto Carlos.

In August 2011 Kļava was given to the Russian First Division club FK Khimki on a half-year loan. Having played 11 matches there, he returned to Anzhi at the end of 2011. Before the start of the 2012 season Kļava rejoined his home-town club Liepājas Metalurgs playing in the Latvian Higher League. He scored 2 goals in 14 league matches.

In July 2012 Kļava signed a contract with the Azerbaijan Premier League club AZAL. In his first two seasons with the club Kļava appeared in 57 league matches and scored 2 goals.

International
Kļava was a member of Latvian U-21 team. He made his international debut for the senior side in 2005 in a 1–1 draw against Thailand under that time national team's manager Jurijs Andrejevs, who had picked him up for a tournament in Bahrain. Kļava scored his first international goal in October 2007 against Iceland.

Career statistics

Club

International
Source:

International goals
Scores and results list Latvia's goal tally first.

Honours

Club
 Virsliga: 2005, 2009; runner-up 2003, 2004, 2006, 2007, 2008
 Latvian Cup 2006
 Baltic League: 2007

International
 Baltic Cup: 2008, 2012

References

External links
 
 
 

1983 births
Living people
Sportspeople from Liepāja
Association football defenders
Latvian footballers
FK Liepājas Metalurgs players
Latvia international footballers
Latvian expatriate footballers
Expatriate footballers in Russia
Latvian expatriate sportspeople in Russia
Latvian Higher League players
Russian Premier League players
Azerbaijan Premier League players
FC Anzhi Makhachkala players
FC Khimki players
AZAL PFK players
FK Liepāja players
Expatriate footballers in Azerbaijan
Latvian expatriate sportspeople in Azerbaijan
Latvian football managers